This is a list of Imperial Japanese Navy armored units that were equipped with Type 89 Chi-Ro medium tank, Type 95 Ha-Go light tank, Type 97 Chi-Ha medium tank and the Type 2 Ka-Mi amphibious tank.
 Shanghai SNLF Tank Company (served during Shanghai Incident period)
 Tank Platoon of Kure 5th SNLF (served in Milne Bay)
 Tank Unit of Sasebo 7th SNLF (served in Betio, Tarawa) its commander: Ensign Ohtani
 Kwajalein Armor Unit of Sasebo 7th SNLF-(served in Kwajalein Atoll)
 Navy tank unit of 55th Guard Unit, Yokosuka 1st SNLF (served in Saipan, Marianas)
 Itoh Armored Detachment SNLF (served in Leyte, Philippines) commander: Commander Itoh
 Makin Armor SNLF Detachment of Navy 3rd Special Base Force (served in Makin)

The IJN SNLF tank units were distinguished by IJN anchor symbol, as opposed to the IJA star.

Notes

References

Imperial Japanese Navy
Disbanded marine forces